The London Parachute School is a BPA affiliated parachuting centre and skydiving drop zone at Chiltern Park Aerodrome  at Ipsden, near Wallingford, Oxfordshire

The drop zone operates a Turbine Cessna 208B Grand Caravan. The centre provides student training in the Ram Air Progression System, Accelerated Freefall (AFF) and tandem skydiving.

References

External links 
 London Parachute School

Parachuting in the United Kingdom